Hutt was a New Zealand parliamentary electorate. It was one of the original electorates in 1853 and existed during two periods until 1978. It was represented by 13 Members of Parliament.

Population centres
The Representation Act 1900 had increased the membership of the House of Representatives from general electorates 70 to 76, and this was implemented through the 1902 electoral redistribution. In 1902, changes to the country quota affected the three-member electorates in the four main centres. The tolerance between electorates was increased to ±1,250 so that the Representation Commissions (since 1896, there had been separate commissions for the North and South Islands) could take greater account of communities of interest. These changes proved very disruptive to existing boundaries, and six electorates were established for the first time, and two electorates that previously existed were re-established, including Hutt.

The main population centre in the electorate was the city of Lower Hutt in the Hutt Valley.

History
The Hutt seat first existed from 1853 to 1870 as a two-member electorate.

At the opening of the 6th session of the 2nd Parliament on 10 April 1858, the speaker read out 14 resignations, including those of Dillon Bell and Samuel Revans. Bell moved to Otago and continued his political career there. On 31 July 1858, a by-election was held, and Alfred Renall and William Fitzherbert were returned.

From 1871 onwards, the electorate was a single-member constituency. Fitzherbert contested the general election on 29 December 1875 against Hutchison and obtained 178 votes, with Hutchison receiving 38. He retained the Hutt electorate until his resignation in 1879, so that he could appointed to the Legislative Council. H. Jackson won the resulting by-election against T. Mason, but Mason was successful against Jackson at the 1879 general election a few months later.

The electorate was abolished in 1893.

In 1902 the seat was recreated and was won by the Liberal leader Thomas Wilford. His party allegiance changed to the United Party, which took over from the Liberal Party by 1928. He resigned in 1929, and the ensuing by-election was won by Walter Nash. Nash became Minister of Finance and Prime Minister, who died in 1968. The seat was then held by Trevor Young, also for Labour.

When the seat was split into Eastern Hutt and Western Hutt in 1978, Young won the new Eastern Hutt seat for Labour.

Members of Parliament
Key:

1853 to 1870
From 1853 to 1870, Hutt was a two-member electorate represented by six Members of Parliament:

1871 to 1893

From 1871 to 1893, the electorate was represented by a further four Members of Parliament, with Fitzherbert continuing his term:

1902 to 1978
From 1902 to 1978, the electorate was represented by three Members of Parliament:

Election results

1975 election

1972 election

1969 election

1968 by-election

1966 election

1963 election

1960 election

1957 election

1954 election

1951 election

1949 election

1946 election

1943 election

1938 election

1935 election

1931 election

 
 
 
 

 

Table footnotes:

1929 by-election

1928 election

1925 election

1922 election

1919 election

1914 election

1911 election

1908 election

1905 election

1902 election

1890 election

1858 by-election

1856 by-election

Notes

References

Historical electorates of New Zealand
Lower Hutt
1853 establishments in New Zealand
1978 disestablishments in New Zealand
1893 disestablishments in New Zealand
1902 establishments in New Zealand